House, also referred to as "playing house" or "play grown up", is a traditional children's game. It's a form of make believe where players take on the roles of a nuclear family. Common roles include parents, children, a newborn, and pets.

The game often involves props, such as toy food. Additionally, dolls can play the role family members. Model houses and play kitchens are toys which are often specifically intended for playing house.
The game is played both at home and in kindergarten or day care.

In other cultures
In  Chinese, the game is called "扮家家酒" or "过家家" (playing/living a family).
In Dutch, the game is called "vadertje en moedertje" (little father and little mother).
In  German, the game is called "Mutter, Vater, Kind" (mother, father, child).
In Hungarian, the game is called "papás-mamás" (fatherly-motherly).
In Japanese, the game is called "ままごと"(playing cooking).
In Persian, the common term (خاله بازی or مامان بازی) means "mother play" or "auntie play", highlighting that the game is stereotypically played by girls.
In Russian, the game is called дочки-матери (daughters-and-mothers).
In Swedish, the game is called "Mamma, pappa, barn" (mother, father, child).

See also
Role playing

References

Children's games